Tyras Snowden "Bunk" Athey (March 30, 1927 – July 20, 2010) was an American politician from Maryland. Athey served in the Maryland House of Delegates 1967–1993 and Secretary of State of Maryland 1993–1995.

Background
Athey was the son of the late Joseph T. (Tax) and Harriett E. Athey. Athey's parents owned and operated a country grocery store, he was born and raised in Burtonsville. His grandfather nicknamed him "Bunk" after a popular 1920s comic strip character. He attended Montgomery County public schools.

In the legislature
Athey served in the House of Delegates, initially representing district 6a from 1967 to 1974. After the 1974 redistricting, he represented the 32nd district in Anne Arundel County, from 1975 to 1993. He was chairman of the House Ways and Means committee for nearly 10 years, from 1983 to 1993. During this time his committee passed legislation giving fiscal relief to the Maryland thoroughbred racing industry in the form of decreased handles and tax breaks. He was also a member of the Atlantic States Marine Fisheries Commission, 1976–80; the Joint Budget and Audit Committee, 1979–90. Athey also chaired the Commission on Intergovernmental Cooperation and was a member of the Executive Committee of the Southern Legislative Conference. Other committees incled: the Fiscal Affairs and Governmental Operations Committee, the Anne Arundel County Delegation, the Maryland Committee on Federal Income Tax Conformity, the Special Joint Committee on Patuxent Institution, the Special Joint Committee on Income Tax Reform, the House Rules and Executive Nominations Committee, the Legislative Policy Committee, the Management Subcommittee, the Spending Affordability Committee and the Special Joint Committee on Energy Pricing. Athey served as the Maryland representative to the Council of State Governments.

Notes

People from Burtonsville, Maryland
Military personnel from Maryland
Members of the Maryland House of Delegates
Secretaries of State of Maryland
1927 births
2010 deaths
People from Anne Arundel County, Maryland